Carlo van Dam (born 27 February 1986 in Vlaardingen) is a Dutch racing driver. He is currently a factory driver for Subaru and he is the reserve and tear driver for R&D Sport in the Super GT Series while driving for Subaru Tecnica International in the 24 Hours of Nürburgring and the Nürburgring Endurance Series.

Career

Formula Renault
A veteran of karting, and a former member of the Renault Driver Development programme, van Dam stepped up into single-seaters in 2004, competing mainly in the Dutch Formula Renault series. In his debut season, he achieved three pole positions and three fastest laps, on his way to fifth in the championship. He also competed in four German Formula Renault races, amassing eighteen points in total. He continued in the Dutch series in 2005, and also moved up to the pan-European championship with SG Formula. With most of his focus on the European series, van Dam finished on the podium four times on his way to fourth in the championship. He ended up seventh in the Dutch series, despite only competing in six races. 2006 saw a second season of European Formula Renault for van Dam, and he added a campaign in the French series, again with SG Formula. Despite only winning one of the first twelve races, van Dam trailed Chris van der Drift by just two points in the Eurocup standings, going into the final round in Barcelona. However, both drivers were overtaken by Filipe Albuquerque as the Portuguese driver won both races to clinch the title. Van Dam was fourteenth overall in the French series, competing in just six of the races due to his Eurocup campaign.

Formula Three

Van Dam moved up to Formula Three for 2007, competing for Van Amersfoort Racing in the ATS Formel 3 Cup. He was a runaway winner of the championship, clinching the title with a round to spare at the Sachsenring, amassing sixteen podiums from the eighteen races. He also became the youngest championship winner in its history, however this has since been surpassed by Laurens Vanthoor, who won the 2009 championship. Van Dam also tested a GP2 Series car at the end of the season, as a result of winning the title. He also made appearances in the Formula Three Euroseries for RC Motorsport, at the final round at Hockenheim, and the Renault Eurocup for Racing for Belgium. He made his first trip to Macau for the world-famous Macau Grand Prix, but failed to finish the race for HBR Motorsport.

Move to Japan
After failing to find a suitable drive in Europe, van Dam followed the lead of James Courtney, Adrian Sutil and Oliver Jarvis and moved to Japan to compete in the All-Japan Formula Three series, with the TOM'S team. He dominated the series, winning nine of the eighteen races, finishing every race on the podium en route to a 103-point winning margin over teammate Keisuke Kunimoto. TOM's also won the teams title, winning the championship by 187 points. Van Dam also made three appearances in the Super GT series, competing in the GT500 class at the Suzuka 1000km, and in the GT300 class at Autopolis and Fuji Speedway. At Suzuka, he ended up third overall, teaming up with TOM'S regular Super GT drivers Juichi Wakisaka and André Lotterer. In GT300, van Dam replaced Cusco Racing's Kota Sasaki, and ended up with results of sixth at Autopolis, and third at Fuji.

At the conclusion of the season, van Dam headed to the Macau Grand Prix with TOM's, and took a surprise pole for the team for the qualification race, heading Kunimoto in a TOM's 1-2. A disappointing qualification race saw van Dam retire on the first lap, having suffered a puncture at Mandarin Bend and then collided with fellow Dutchman Renger van der Zande at San Francisco. He retired on lap seven of the Grand Prix, that was eventually won by teammate Kunimoto.

Return to Europe
A return to the Formula Three Euroseries beckoned for van Dam, with a 2009 campaign for Kolles & Heinz Union, the new team set up by Colin Kolles and Werner Heinz. However, the partnership was not to last, as after the rounds at Lausitz, van Dam parted company with the team. In four races, his best finish was eighteenth during the season-opening race at Hockenheim. Van Dam drove in the 24-hour endurance races at the Nürburgring and at Spa, before agreeing to drive the car of PSV Eindhoven in the Superleague Formula series. He replaced Dominick Muermans in the car, with the team lying eighteenth in the overall standings. However, he returned to the Euroseries, for the Barcelona rounds, rejoining his former team SG Formula.

Racing record

Career summary

† - Team standings.

Superleague Formula record
(key)

2009
(Races in bold indicate pole position) (Races in italics indicate fastest lap)

2009 Super Final Results
Super Final results in 2009 did not count for points towards the main championship.

Complete Super GT results

Complete Blancpain GT Series Sprint Cup results

Complete 24 Hours of Nürburgring results

References

External links
 Official website
 Career statistics from Driver Database

1986 births
Living people
Dutch racing drivers
People from Vlaardingen
Superleague Formula drivers
Formula 3 Euro Series drivers
Japanese Formula 3 Championship drivers
German Formula Three Championship drivers
Formula Renault Eurocup drivers
French Formula Renault 2.0 drivers
Dutch Formula Renault 2.0 drivers
German Formula Renault 2.0 drivers
Super GT drivers
Karting World Championship drivers
Eurocup Mégane Trophy drivers
24 Hours of Spa drivers
Asian Le Mans Series drivers
Sportspeople from South Holland
Nürburgring 24 Hours drivers
TOM'S drivers
RC Motorsport drivers
Van Amersfoort Racing drivers
SG Formula drivers
Kolles Racing drivers
Larbre Compétition drivers
Craft-Bamboo Racing drivers
Volkswagen Motorsport drivers